Marasmius limosus is a mushroom in the family Marasmiaceae.

See also
List of Marasmius species

References

limosus
Fungi described in 1878
Fungi of Europe